John O'Flynn was an Irish who served firstly as parish priest at Curry, County Sligo; and then as  Bishop of Achonry from 1809 until his death on 18 July 1817.

References

1817 deaths
19th-century Roman Catholic bishops in Ireland
Roman Catholic bishops of Achonry